Merritt Island Airport  is a general aviation public airport under the administration of the Titusville-Cocoa Airport Authority. It located in Merritt Island, Brevard County, Florida, United States, northwest of Patrick Space Force Base.

History
In the early 1940s, the Brevard County Mosquito Control District constructed the Central Brevard Airport. The airfield included two sod landing strips: a north-south strip measuring approximately 1,800 feet in length, and a northwest southeast strip measuring approximately 3,000 feet in length.

An operations building and maintenance hangar were located on the south side of the airfield and the Mosquito Control District had a maintenance hangar on the north side of the airfield. The north-south landing strip was eventually abandoned, replaced by various facilities such as T-hangars that currently occupy this area. The Brevard County Mosquito Control District subsequently deeded the Central Brevard Airport property over to the Titusville-Cocoa Airport Authority in exchange for ten acres of land located within Space Coast Regional Airport. Central Brevard Airport was renamed Merritt Island Airport and became a public general aviation facility.

Facilities

 Runway 11/29: , surface: asphalt

Government activities
 Brevard County Sheriff's Office Aviation Unit

Businesses
 Space Coast Aviation - Merritt Island's FBO
 2FLY Airborne - international pilot training
 Aerocomp - airplane manufacturer
 Buzz Airlines - aircraft charters; has a base at the airport
 Voyager Aviation International - flight training
 Sebastian Communication Inc. - avionics sales, installation and repairs

References
Titusville-Cocoa Airport Authority (official site)

External links

Airports in Brevard County, Florida
Buildings and structures in Merritt Island, Florida
1940s establishments in Florida